Galeoglossum is a genus of orchids native to Mexico and Guatemala.

Species:
Galeoglossum cactorum Salazar & C.Chávez - Oaxaca
Galeoglossum thysanochilum (B.L.Rob. & Greenm.) Salazar - Oaxaca
Galeoglossum tubulosum (Lindl.) Salazar & Soto Arenas from Central Mexico south to Guatemala

References 

Cranichideae genera
Cranichidinae